Grand Rapids–Itasca County Airport , also known as Gordon Newstrom Field or Gordy Newstrom Field, is a public airport located two miles (3 km) southeast of the central business district (CBD) of Grand Rapids, a city in Itasca County, Minnesota, United States. The airport has three runways.

Scheduled commercial flights to Minneapolis via Mesaba Airlines were operated from 1973 until March 2004. Mesaba began an affiliation with Northwest Airlines in late 1984 at which time the service began operating as Northwest Airlink.

Facilities and aircraft 
The airport covers an area of 1400 acres (567 ha) at an elevation of 1,355 feet (413 m) above mean sea level. 
In January 2017, there were 75 aircraft based at this airport: 71 single-engine, 3 multi-engine and 1 jet.

Cargo 

Bemidji Airlines (Minneapolis/St. Paul)

References 

Grand Rapids-Itasca County Airport (City of Grand Rapids web site)

External links 
  

Defunct airports in Minnesota
Airports in Minnesota
Buildings and structures in Itasca County, Minnesota
Transportation in Itasca County, Minnesota